Carlin Hartman (born August 14, 1972) is a basketball coach who currently is the Associate head coach at Florida.  He is a 1990 graduate of Grand Island Senior High School in Grand Island, NY. As a senior, he was an Honorable Mention McDonald's All-American.  He attended Tulane University from 1991–1994 and was on the Metro Conference All-Freshman Team in 1991 and All-Conference Honorable Mention in 1994.  Hartman was the 6th man on Tulane teams that made the NCAA tournament in 1992 and 1993.  Those teams upset higher seeded St. John's and Kansas State, respectively.

Hartman finished his career at Tulane 6th all time in steals and 10th in scoring and rebounds.  In February 2011, Hartman was named to Tulane's All-Decade Team (1990s), part of the Green Wave's celebration of 100 years of basketball.  Hartman collected 1,180 points and 538 rebounds during his career at Tulane. Hartman was inducted into the Tulane Hall of Fame along with his 91–92 team as part of the 2020 induction class.

Hartman was drafted by the Rapid City Thrillers of the Continental Basketball Association, where he earned All-Rookie honors in 1995.

External links
Coaching bio

1972 births
Living people
American men's basketball players
Basketball players from New York (state)
Centenary Gentlemen basketball coaches
Columbia Lions men's basketball coaches
James Madison Dukes men's basketball coaches
Louisiana Ragin' Cajuns men's basketball coaches
McNeese Cowboys basketball coaches
People from Grand Island, New York
Rapid City Thrillers players
Rice Owls men's basketball coaches
Richmond Spiders men's basketball coaches
Shreveport Crawdads players
Small forwards
Tulane Green Wave men's basketball players